Brasstown may mean:

Brasstown, Georgia, United States, for which Brasstown Bald was named
Brasstown, North Carolina, United States, located in Clay County, North Carolina on the North Carolina-Georgia border.
Brasstown Township, Clay County, North Carolina, United States
Brasstown, South Carolina, United States
Twon-Brass, town in Nigeria